The Comet was an American science fiction fanzine, the first of its kind.

History
It was first published in May 1930 by the Science Correspondence Club in Chicago, Illinois.

The fanzine's original editors were Raymond A. Palmer and Walter Dennis. Its second issue, dated July 1930, was called "?", and was the first issue to refer directly to science fiction. The third issue, dated August 1930, took on its third title, Cosmology, a name it retained for the duration of its publication, which ended in 1933.

References

Defunct science fiction magazines published in the United States
Magazines established in 1930
Magazines disestablished in 1933
Science fiction fanzines
Magazines published in Chicago